Feedreader is a free RSS and Atom aggregator for Windows. It has a stripped down, though configurable, three-pane interface similar to NetNewsWire on Mac OS X. Recent beta versions use MySQL as database back-end.

Feedreader was one of the first desktop feed readers; version 1.54 of Feedreader of the application were distributed on April 24, 2001. The company behind Feedreader says that it was the first personal desktop RSS reader.

Feedreader has an auto-discovery feature, whose purpose is to find RSS feeds on any web page and subscribe to them in an automated fashion. Moreover, the program can use keyboard shortcuts, search through one's RSS feeds, and can be run from a USB flash drive. The installation file is 4.44 MB, which is notably small for a feed reader with such features.

Ownership
In an un-dated announcement published on the Feedreader website it was stated that "...after years of successful development by i-Systems Inc. Feedreader has been acquired by a new professional and reliable developer." However ownership of Feedreader is not disclosed on the organisation's website and it is unclear whether the service is owned by a private individual, a partnership, a corporation, or some other type of entity. Websearches carried out on 8 January 2014 did not disclose whether the owner and/or controller of Feedreader is domiciled or resident in the United States or elsewhere. The "Contact Us" page of the company's website gives a postal address and telephone number which are shared by the operators of another website surdotly.com but this site is also silent as to its ownership. Users of feedreaders need to be aware that the operator of the reader software may have access to records of the websites from which feeds are derived and in the absence of knowledge as to who those operators might be users should be cautious about the personal profile information which the use of a feedreader may disclose to unknown parties.

See also
 Comparison of feed aggregators

References

Notes
 Fileforums.betanews.com
 
 i-Systems Inc.  "About us", Feedreader Homepage, March 25, 2008. Accessed March 25, 2008

External links

News aggregator software